Drew Meekins (born April 10, 1985) is an American retired pairs skater and choreographer. With former partner Julia Vlassov, he is the 2006 World Junior Champion. Meekins attended the 2018 Olympic Games with Mirai Nagasu.

Skating career
Meekins and Vlassov won the 2006 World Junior Championships. In their first season of senior international competition, they won the silver at the Nebelhorn Trophy, placed sixth at the 2006 Cup of China, and placed 5th at the 2006 NHK Trophy. Vlassov and Meekins finished in 7th place in their senior debut at the 2007 U.S. Championships. They were fifth in the free program.

Vlassov and Meekins were assigned to two Grand Prix events for the 2007–2008 season; however, they were forced to withdraw from the 2007 Skate Canada International before the event began due to an injury to Meekins's shoulder which occurred during an attempted lift in practice. Vlassov and Meekins announced the end of their partnership on November 8, 2007.

U.S. Figure Skating announced on July 14, 2008, that Meekins had teamed up with Jessica Rose Paetsch. Paetsch and Meekins placed 10th at the 2009 U.S. Championships.

After qualifying for the 2010 U.S. Championships, Paetsch & Meekins announced the end of their partnership in December 2009.

Meekins is now a figure skating coach at the Broadmoor skating club in Colorado Springs, CO. He has worked with many skaters, including coaching and choreographing Vincent Zhou when he won the title of 2017 Junior world Champion and Mirai Nagasu when she won bronze at the 2018 Olympic Games.

Meekins now coaches a wide range of skaters and offers virtual lessons and other resources on his website.

Early life and family

Andrew Meekins, known as "Drew", was born in Juneau, Alaska on April 10, 1985. He is one of five children (four sons and one daughter) born to Edward Russell "Russ" Meekins, Jr. (1949–2020) and his wife Nancy Harvey. All four of his grandparents moved to Anchorage, Alaska from the Northeastern United States during the tail end of World War II and were active in business and civic affairs in Anchorage throughout the middle and late 20th century. His father, his aunt Susan Sullivan, and his grandfather Russ Meekins Sr. all served in the Alaska State Legislature as Democrats representing Anchorage. His father, the only one of the three to serve more than one term, was the House's majority leader in his last term (1981–1983). In that term, he played a key role in two events which rank amongst the most significant in the history of the Alaska Legislature: the mid-session overthrow of the Democratic House leadership and its replacement with a multi-party coalition, and the bribery conviction and subsequent expulsion of a member of the Alaska Senate. As a result of the fallout from these events, he soon found himself on the outs with Alaska's political establishment. The family left Alaska ca. 1990 and moved to Massachusetts, the home state of Nancy Harvey's parents, settling on Cape Cod. One of his brothers, Cam Meekins, is a rapper.

Programs 
(with Vlassov)

Competitive highlights

With Paetsch

With Vlassov

References

External links

 Vlassov & Meekins official site

American male pair skaters
1985 births
Living people
People from Juneau, Alaska
Sportspeople from Alaska
World Junior Figure Skating Championships medalists
21st-century American people